Cubilla is a Spanish surname. Notable people with the surname include:

Luis Cubilla (1940–2013), Uruguayan footballer and manager
Pedro Cubilla (1933–2007), Uruguayan footballer and manager
Walter Cubilla (born 1989), Argentine footballer

Spanish-language surnames